Barbora Krejčíková was the defending champion, but chose to participate in Bucharest instead.

Elizaveta Kulichkova won the title, defeating Ekaterina Alexandrova in an all-Russian final, 4–6, 6–2, 6–1.

Seeds

Main draw

Finals

Top half

Bottom half

References 
 Main draw

ITS Cup - Singles
ITS Cup